Heinz Strunk, legal name Mathias Halfpape (born 17 May 1962) is a German novelist, humorist musician, actor and member of Hamburg-based comedy trio Studio Braun. Strunk’s comedy ranges from goofy prank calls to biting political and cultural satire, often involving music. Strunk plays woodwind and keyboard instruments.

Career 
Strunk was born in Bevensen and grew up in Hamburg. He has released three audio albums with Studio Braun containing prank phone calls. An example of such calls include Strunk calling a coal merchant to order coke, where he means cocaine but the coal merchant understands coke fuel. In another call, Strunk phones a resident of rural Saxony, an area known for a strong regional accent, to offer him free elocution lessons to “correct” his Saxon accent. Strunk claims to represent a fictional charity for Hamburg residents to “help” Saxony.

In 2003 Studio Braun released the song Komputerfreak, which takes a serious look at the washed-up lives and addictive/compulsive personalities of those who spend large amounts of time using computers.

In 2004 Strunk’s comic novel Fleisch ist mein Gemüse (Meat is my vegetable) was published, based on his own youth as a musician in various small-time bands in the 1980s. The film of the book was released in 2008, directed by Christian Görlitz and filmed in and around Hamburg. In 2010 the novel was adapted into a stage play.

The writer and actor has an alter ego called Jürgen Dose. His works often deal with social outcasts and the bleakness of everyday life.

Strunk is a member of the German satirical political party Die PARTEI (“The PARTY”).

In 2016 Strunk’s highly praised novel Der goldene Handschuh (The Golden Glove) was published. The bestseller tells the story of the German serial killer Fritz Honka. Strunk won the Wilhelm Raabe Literature Prize and was nominated for the Leipzig Book Fair Prize. German director Fatih Akin acquired the film rights to make a movie based on Der goldene Handschuh. The eponymous film was released in 2019 and received mixed critical reviews.

Works 

Books
2004: Fleisch ist mein Gemüse
2008: Die Zunge Europas
2009: Fleckenteufel
2011: Heinz Strunk in Afrika
2013: Junge rettet Freund aus Teich
2014: Das Strunk-Prinzip
2016: Der goldene Handschuh
2017: Jürgen
2018: Das Teemännchen
2019: Nach Notat zu Bett: Heinz Strunks Intimschatulle
2021: Es ist immer so schön mit dir

Filmography
1999: Derby – Fußball ist kein Wunschkonzert (short film)
2007: Immer nie am Meer
2007: Zeit (short film)
2008: Krauts, Doubts & Rock ’n’ Roll (Fleisch ist mein Gemüse)
2011: Trittschall im Kriechkeller – Die neue Schwester (short film)
2012: 
2013: 
2014: Mord mit Aussicht (TV, 1 episode)
2015: Drei Eier im Glas
2017: Jürgen – Heute wird gelebt (TV film)
2019: Der goldene Handschuh (cameo)

TV shows
 2003–04: Fleischmann TV (host)
 Since 2013: extra 3 (commentator)
 2016: Herr Strunk, Herr Schulz und das Jahr 2016 (host)

Solo albums
 1993: Spaß mit Heinz
 1994: Der Mettwurstpapst
 1999: Der Schlagoberst kommt
 2003: Einz
 2005: Trittschall im Kriechkeller
 2006: Mit Hass gekocht
 2007: Der Schorfopa
 2015: Sie nannten ihn Dreirad
 2017: Die gläserne Milf
 2019: Aufstand der dünnen Hipsterärmchen

Albums with Studio Braun
1999: Gespräche 1
2000: Gespräche 2
2001: Jeans Gags
2002: Fear of a Gag Planet
2004: Ein Kessel Braunes
2012: Braunes Gold

Albums with Fraktus
2012: Millenium Edition
2015: Welcome to the Internet

Stage plays
2005: Phoenix – Wem gehört das Licht
2010: Fleisch ist mein Gemüse: Eine Landjugend mit Musik 
2017: Der goldene Handschuh

External links
 
 

1962 births
German male musicians
Living people